Cumanotus is a genus of sea slugs, aeolid nudibranchs, marine gastropod mollusks. It is the only genus in the family Cumanotidae.

Species
There are three species within the genus Cumanotus:
 Cumanotus beaumonti (Eliot, 1906)
 Cumanotus cuenoti Pruvot-Fol, 1948
 Cumanotus fernaldi Thompson & Brown, 1984

References

Cumanotidae